Elizabeth is an unincorporated community in western Fulton County, Arkansas, United States. Elizabeth has a post office with ZIP code 72531.

References

Unincorporated communities in Fulton County, Arkansas
Unincorporated communities in Arkansas